Monkey Town or Monkeytown may refer to:

Monkeytown, West Virginia
Moncton, New Brunswick
Monkey Town, a historical nickname for Dayton, Tennessee, the location of the Scopes Trial
Monkey Town (novel), a 2006 novel about the 1925 Scopes Trial
Monkeytown (album), a 2011 studio album by Modeselektor
Monkey Town Continental Team, a Dutch cycling team